The 1912–13 season was the eighth in the history of the Isthmian League, an English football competition.

London Caledonians were champions, winning their fourth Isthmian League title. At the end of the season Tunbridge Wells resigned from the league and joined the Spartan League.

League table

References

Isthmian League seasons
I